The 41st New Brunswick general election is scheduled to take place on or before October 21, 2024, according to the Legislative Assembly Act of 2017 which states that an election should be held every four years on the third Monday in October.

Background

Defections and de-registration of the People's Alliance 
On March 30, 2022, Kris Austin and Michelle Conroy announced their departures from the People's Alliance to join the Progressive Conservatives. Austin said that the result of the 2020 provincial election, when the party lost one of its three seats, had prompted him to undertake some “soul-searching”, but that he believed he had changed politics in New Brunswick. Both Austin and Conroy stated that they believed they could better represent their ridings from within government.

Premier and Progressive Conservative leader Blaine Higgs expressed excitement about his party's new MLAs, but reiterated the party's support for official bilingualism when questioned about the People's Alliance's previous stances on the issue. The acceptance of MLAs who had expressed anti-bilingual opinions was criticized by the Acadian Society of New Brunswick, an organization promoting the rights of francophones in the province, when their president Alexandre Cédric Doucet said that he was happy to see the Alliance dissolve, but that it was "a sad day" for the Progressive Conservatives.

The Chief Electoral Officer of New Brunswick confirmed that the Peoples Alliance of New Brunswick would be deregistered as a provincial party on March 31, 2022. In April 2022, interim leader Rick DeSaulniers and party announced plans to re-register as a party. Elections New Brunswick confirmed the party was re-registered in May 2022.

Current standings

Summary of seat changes

Opinion polls
Voting Intentions in New Brunswick since the 2020 election

Notes

References

Opinion poll sources 

New Brunswick
2024
New Brunswick